The Lac des Settons (Lake of the Settons) is a reservoir in the Nièvre department, France, with a surface area of . Supplied mainly by the River Cure, it is situated in the heart of Morvan Regional Natural Park. The lake is found south of the town Montsauche-les-Settons. It is one of the Great Lakes of the Morvan.

General overview 
The reservoir was intended to regulate traffic on the Yonne River and help allow timber rafting to Paris.

History

Construction 
The first surveys date back to the time of Louis XVI, but these were never completed. They were restarted under the command of André Dupin. On 15 July 1854, the work was contracted to Perrichon, an entrepreneur from Nevers. Meanwhile, the execution of the work was carried out by Cambuzat, Lepeuple and Otry of Labrit. The construction of the dam was started in 1854 and finished in 1858. To get the granite, they pushed north to the heights of the Ponceaux, and south to those of the Outre-Cure. The dam was dedicated on 13 May 1858 by the future Bishop of Troyes, Pierre-Louis-Marie Cortet.

Several buildings were submerged, notably windmills that can still be seen every decade or so, when the reservoir is emptied. In 1861, the new construction was required to repair water damage. Around 1920, the lake lost its main function since timber was no longer rafted to Paris due to wood's replacement by coal as a fuel source. The lake was then abandoned for several decades.

Later years
The dam became a listed site in 1937. The lake then became popular leisure destination. In 1956 the first camping site opened for business, while the hotels increased in number.

References

Settons